is a manga series written and illustrated by Hideaki Yoshikawa. There was an OVA adaptation released along with the fourth volume, animated by Hoods Entertainment and directed by Hiraku Kaneko.

Story

Characters
 
 
 Haruki is high school boy with two eccentric girl friends. He gets involved in ecchi troubles caused by the two as they try to get him to join their respective clubs.
 
 
 Touko is the older sister of Ayana. She can become invisible at will. She becomes the nurse of the school that Ayana, Airi, and Haruki attend, and is known there for her very large breasts.
 
 
 Airi is an eccentric half-cyborg girl and friends with Haruki Komaba. She views Ayana as her rival. She is the head of the Technological Science Club.
 
 
 Ayana is an experiment created by her "mother," a woman who worked in a genetics lab experimenting with splicing human genes with various animals. After hundreds of failures, the first success came out of the combination of a random dog breed and Ayana's mother's own genes. Luckily, Ayana's mother had some sense of kindness, and as soon as Ayana was old enough to be out in the world, Ayana's mother left the little hybrid in the care of her sister. She charged Touko with trying to give Ayana the closest thing to a normal life she can. Ayana told people she had a rare condition, and luckily, they seemed to accept her as a fellow student. Like her older sister, she is also known for her exaggerated, sensitive breasts. She is the head of the Chemical Science Club.

References

External links 
 

Akita Shoten manga
Hoods Entertainment
Seinen manga
Sex comedy anime and manga